Gamadji Saré is an arrondissement of Podor in Saint-Louis Region in Senegal.

References 

Arrondissements of Senegal